= Race Car Simulator =

1984 video game

- Publisher(s): Creative Solutions
- Release: 1984

Race Car Simulator is a 1984 video game published by Creative Solutions.

== Gameplay ==
Race Car Simulator is a game in which an overhead view of the racetrack and a view from the driver's eye are both available, and the game includes the option to design race tracks.

== Reception ==
Frank C. Boosman reviewed the game for Computer Gaming World, and stated that "RCS is a good game, but needs some additional features."
